In mathematics, mathematical maturity is an informal term often used to refer to the quality of having a general understanding and mastery of the way mathematicians operate and communicate. It pertains to a mixture of mathematical experience and insight that cannot be directly taught. Instead, it comes from repeated exposure to mathematical concepts. It is a gauge of mathematics students' erudition in mathematical structures and methods, and can overlap with other related concepts such as mathematical intuition and mathematical competence. The topic is occasionally also addressed in literature in its own right.

Definitions 

Mathematical maturity has been defined in several different ways by various authors, and is often tied to other related concepts such as comfort and competence with mathematics, mathematical intuition and mathematical beliefs.

One definition has been given as follows:

A broader list of characteristics of mathematical maturity has been given as follows:

Finally, mathematical maturity has also been defined as an ability to do the following:
It is sometimes said that the development of mathematical maturity requires a deep reflection on the subject matter for a prolonged period of time, along with a guiding spirit which encourages exploration.

See also 

 Logical intuition

References

Mathematics and culture
Skills
Literacy